Aleksandr Alekseyevich Safoshkin (born 13 March 1976 in Rostov) is a Russian gymnast.

Biography
Originally Safoshkin was a gymnast without outstanding results, then he retired and joined the Russian Circus. As a result of his specific training to perfect his act, he improved his strength and became a successful performer on Rings. He was then invited by Leonid Arkaev to join the Russian National Team in 2002 and good results followed shortly. He was Gold medalist at the 2003 Glasgow Grand Prix; 2004 European Champion (in a tie with Tampakos GRE), 7th at the 2004 Athens Olympic Games.

See also
 List of Olympic male artistic gymnasts for Russia

References

External links
 Biography 
 
 
 

1976 births
Living people
Russian male artistic gymnasts
Olympic gymnasts of Russia
Gymnasts at the 2004 Summer Olympics
European champions in gymnastics
Medalists at the World Artistic Gymnastics Championships
Sportspeople from Rostov-on-Don
21st-century Russian people